The Dalton Girls is a 1957 American Western film directed by Reginald Le Borg and starring Merry Anders, Lisa Davis, Penny Edwards, Sue George and John Russell.

Plot
Two men on horseback are fleeing a posse. Pistol shots are exchanged and the two men are killed. The scene shifts to town where the undertaker, Slidell, has posted a fee of twenty-five cents to view the remains of the Dalton brothers.

A private agency detective, Parsh, approaches Slidell wanting to identify the bodies. Slidell insists on the fee. As Parsh views the bodies,  Slidell taunts the detective that he had been unable to apprehend the Dalton brothers though pursuing them for years.

Two young women arrive. Parsh greets them as Holly and Rose; he expresses his condolences, but he is rebuked by Holly. Holly pushes past both men to view the bodies and Parsh leaves. Slidell follows Holly and takes the opportunity to physically accost her. Holly resists, killing Slidell in the struggle. Holly and Rose flee.

Six years later, in Eastern Colorado, Holly and Rose, along with their sisters, Columbine and Marigold, prepare to rob a stagecoach using subterfuge. Two of the sisters ride as passengers on the coach; Columbine is attracted to another passenger, a smooth-talking gambler, "Illinois" Grey. During the robbery, Grey insists Columbine take his pocket watch as part of the robbery loot. Rose shoots two men who attempt to bring firearms to bear, killing one.

The four sisters escape to the shack where they live, only to discover that the expected payroll is not in the strongbox they've taken; this leads to a brief confrontation. Meanwhile, Marigold meets a young man at the barn. He asks her to marry him, but then flees when he learns that the sisters are Daltons. Holly and Rose chase him down and leave him tied up while the sisters make their further escape.

Meanwhile, in town, Grey is not cooperative when asked for a witness statement about the stagecoach robbery, apparently trying to protect the sisters, though there are other witnesses.

At a campfire, the other sisters listen as Rose sings a song about her gun being more dependable than any man. Afterward, they discuss plans for another robbery and Columbine suggests they go to a gold camp, Dry Creek, though she doesn't reveal that she knows this was Illinois Grey's destination.

In Dry Creek, Grey demands payment of a gambling debt from a banker, Sewell. The banker begs off until the evening. As Grey leaves, the sisters begin infiltrating the same bank, intent on robbing it. However, Grey recognizes Columbine, who returns his watch when he confronts her. Grey insists on accompanying Columbine to her "new job" and inadvertently interferes in the robbery. Rose kills Sewell when the banker grabs a pistol and then shoots Grey, the only witness, though Columbine objects. The sisters don't know that Grey is unharmed because Rose's bullet struck his pocket watch.

The sisters elude a posse but then argue. Columbine accuses Holly and Rose of being deliberately violent. Marigold pleads for peace between the sisters, threatening to kill herself.

In town, Grey once more is evasive as a witness, saying only that three women were the robbers. Parsh confronts him privately, specifying that he wants to capture the sisters after a string of crimes. Grey claims not to know the Dalton sisters and suggests the robbers were female impersonators. More deliberate than the posse, Grey tracks the sisters to Tombstone.

In Tombstone, Grey renews his acquaintance with the town lawman, who informs him that the big poker game is in a private hotel room that night. Later, Grey encounters Holly and Rose who are working as dance hall girls. Grey demands the money they stole from Sewell, the banker, insisting it was owed him. He tells them to bring the money that evening on threat of reporting their wanted status to the local authorities.

Grey finds out where the sisters live and goes there to see Columbine. He pleads with her to come away with him but, in the end, she sends him away.

While the gamblers gather for the big poker game, and the sisters get dressed while developing a plan to rob the game, Parsh arrives in town.

The sisters go about preparing their escape, taking measures to make pursuit difficult, infiltrating the hotel where the game is being played, and eluding the lawman providing security. They confront the players and gather their money. Columbine threatens to shoot Rose if Grey is harmed. The sisters exit to the street and are riding away when Parsh steps out and begins shooting, killing Marigold. Rose is killed in the gunfight that develops with the townsmen, and Holly is wounded. Holly and Columbine surrender. They are taken off to jail, with Parsh shepherding Holly and Grey carrying Columbine in his arms.

Cast
 Merry Anders as Holly Dalton
 Lisa Davis as Rose Dalton
 Penny Edwards as Columbine Dalton
 Sue George as Marigold Dalton
 John Russell as W.T. 'Illinois' Grey
 Ed Hinton as Detective Hiram Parsh
 Glenn Dixon as Mr. Slidell
 Johnny Western as Joe
 Malcolm Atterbury as Mr. Sewell
 Douglas Henderson as Bank Cashier
 Kevin Enright as George

Production
Parts of the film were shot in Kanab Canyon, Kanab Creek, and Johnson Canyon in Utah.

References

External links 
 

1957 films
United Artists films
American Western (genre) films
1957 Western (genre) films
Films directed by Reginald Le Borg
Films scored by Les Baxter
Films shot in Utah
Girls with guns films
1950s English-language films
1950s American films